Achh is a village and union council of Gujrat District, in the Punjab province of Pakistan. It is part of Kharian Tehsil and is located at 32°52'0N 74°8'0E with an altitude of 311 metres.
Achh is Birthplace of famous Punjabi Singer, Alam Lohar.

References

Union councils of Gujrat District
Populated places in Gujrat District